Kosswigia insularis is a species of beetle in the family Carabidae, the only species in the genus Kosswigia.

References

Trechinae